The Petit Le Mans (French for little Le Mans) is a sports car endurance race held annually at Road Atlanta in Braselton, Georgia, USA. It has often used the rules established for the 24 Hours of Le Mans by the Automobile Club de l'Ouest (ACO), which are slightly modified if necessary, mainly to allow additional cars to compete.

The race was founded by Road Atlanta owner Don Panoz and first run on October 10, 1998 as part of the IMSA season. The 1999 edition was one of the original events of the American Le Mans Series. The 2010 and 2011 editions were also part of the Intercontinental Le Mans Cup, but the 2012 race for the brand-new World Endurance Championship was controversially dropped in favour of Bahrain. Since 2014 the race has been one of the crown jewel events of the IMSA SportsCar Championship.

Since 2014, the duration is 10 hours, without distance limitations. In addition to the overall race, teams of two or three drivers per car compete for class victories in different categories, divided into prototypes and grand tourers. Class winners of the event originally received an automatic invitation to the following year's 24 Hours of Le Mans, however this was removed in 2012.

The race is regarded as one of the major endurance races in the world and is among the biggest sports car races in North America alongside the 24 Hours of Daytona and 12 Hours of Sebring. Rinaldo Capello holds the record of most race wins, having won in 2000, 2002, 2006, 2007 and 2008.

History

The 2009 and 2015 races were shortened due to heavy rains making the track impassable. The 2015 race featured the first time a GT car won overall against the faster prototypes. Rain created a flooded track the entire race causing multiple cautions and a red flag, allowing GTLM cars to leap-frog the prototypes that were struggling for grip in the conditions. Nick Tandy, winner of the 2015 24 Hours of Le Mans, and co-driver Patrick Pilet took the checkered flag when officials called the race with a little over two hours remaining.

Overall winners

Statistics

Multiple wins by driver

Wins by manufacturer

Multiple wins by team

See also
 Grand Prix of Atlanta

Notes

References

External links

 Petit Le Mans
 IMSA SportsCar Championship official site

 
Sports car races
Auto races in the United States
Recurring sporting events established in 1998